West Settlement Methodist Church is a historic Methodist church on West Settlement Road at the junction with Cleveland Road in Ashland, Greene County, New York.  It was built in 1832 and is a one-story, three by four bay, post and beam structure on a limestone block foundation.  It features a moderately pitched gable roof and frieze on the gable ends.

It was added to the National Register of Historic Places in 1996.

See also
North Settlement Methodist Church, also in Ashland and NRHP-listed

References

Methodist churches in New York (state)
Churches on the National Register of Historic Places in New York (state)
Churches completed in 1832
19th-century Methodist church buildings in the United States
Churches in Greene County, New York
National Register of Historic Places in Greene County, New York